Cignus (meaning "swan"; plural: cigni) is a name used by archaeologists for a type of large Roman Empire metal spoon with a short, curved, handle often formed as the neck and head of a swan. Cigni have been found in a number of Roman sites from the 4th and 5th centuries CE, including the Thetford and Hoxne Hoards in England. It is not known for certain what the Romans called these utensils, but there are references to cigni in Roman sources in appropriate contexts.

See also
Cochlearium
Silver spoon

References

Further reading
, pp. 98–106
Harald Mielsch, 'Miszellen zur spätantiken Toreutik', in Archäologisches Anzeiger 1992, pp. 111–152.

Spoons